Streptomyces manipurensis is a bacterium species from the genus of Streptomyces which has been isolated from limestone from Hundung in India.

See also 
 List of Streptomyces species

References 

manipurensis
Bacteria described in 2021